Gurumukh Das Jagwani is an Indian politician from Jalgaon in Maharashtra State, India.  He is a member of the Nationalist congress party NCP.

Jagwani is a member of Maharashtra Legislative Council, with term ending on 5 December 2016. He is elected from Jalgaon Local Authorities constituency.

Jagwani is the Former Maharashtra state minister.

References

People from Jalgaon
Bharatiya Janata Party politicians from Maharashtra
Members of the Maharashtra Legislative Council
Living people
Year of birth missing (living people)